Orwell may refer to:

People 
 George Orwell, pen name of English author Eric Arthur Blair (1903–1950), who took his name after the river Orwell
 Orwellian, the situation, idea, or societal condition that George Orwell identified
 Sonia Orwell (1918–1980), second wife of George Orwell
 Orwell, a pen-name for the poet and hymnwriter Walter Chalmers Smith

Places

Canada
 Orwell, Prince Edward Island, a settlement in Queens County
 Orwell, a community in Malahide, Ontario

United Kingdom
 Orwell, Cambridgeshire, a small village
 Orwell, Kinross-shire, a parish
 River Orwell, in Suffolk
 Orwell High School, Felixstowe, Suffolk, now part of Felixstowe Academy
 Orwell railway station, a disused station in Suffolk

United States
 Orwell Township, Otter Tail County, Minnesota
 Orwell, New York, a town in Oswego County
 Orwell, Ohio, a village in Ashtabula County
 Orwell Township, Bradford County, Pennsylvania
 Orwell, Vermont, a town in Addison County

Other uses
 Orwell Prize, British prize for political writing
 Orwell Award, American prize for writers
 HMS Orwell, various Royal Navy ships 
 Empire Orwell, two ships
 11020 Orwell, an asteroid 
 Orwell (comics), a fictional character in Marvel Comics 
 Orwell (horse), a British Thoroughbred racehorse (1929–1948)
 Orwell (programming language), a functional programming language
 Orwell (video game), a series of simulation games
 Harry Orwell, the protagonist of the television show Harry O
 Orwell comma, a musical interval